Drumaleague Lough is a very small freshwater in northwest Ireland. The ecology of Drumaleague Lough, and other Leitrim waterways, remain threatened by zebra mussel and other invasive species.

Etymology
The origin of the lake name is unknown, but means the "".

Geography
Drumaleague Lough is connected to Lough Conway to the west, and Lough Scur to the east by the Shannon–Erne Waterway.

Ecology
The presence, and type, of fish found in Drumaleague Lough is not recorded.

Human settlement
The primary human settlements near Drumaleague Lough is Drumcong village. Drumaleague Lough is bounded by the townlands of Letterfine to the north and east, Drumaleague to the west, and Seltan (McDonald) to the south and east.

Heritage

Ancient lake dwellers

Two ancient crannogs existed at Drumaleague Lough during the Middle Ages at least. The crannogs were discovered during the 19th century, .

Drumaleague crannog number one a good example of lacustrine dwelling, and with the exception of the hearth-stones, was composed entirely of wood, mainly Alder. The annexed plan conveys a good example of the general arrangement of a crannog, with an outer line of stakes enclosing a circle  in diameter. Stakes driven into the ground were positioned in a single row in some parts of the island, and in double or treble rows, or clusters, in other parts, seemingly for purposes related to some internal arrangement. Because the foundation is very soft, the layers of timber are very deep. A, the central oblong portion, consists of a platform of round logs cut in lengths of 1.2m to 1.8m, possibly the floor of the hut ; B, a collection of stones with marks of fire on them ; C, a heap of stiff clay; D, the root of a large tree nearly buried in the peat, the surface of the wood bevelled off, so as to form a sort of table, under which was foimd a considerable quantity of bones, apparently those of deer and swine.

Drumaleague crannog number two measured  in diameter. The annexed section conveys a good example of the flooring of an oblong house for this type of crannog, surrounded by a regular circular enclosure formed of a single row of oak stakes F, F; and being  in diameter. A, a heap of stones with marks of fire on them, and two other hearths were found in different parts of the island. G, the lower stratum of decayed and blackened sticks and branches of all descriptions lying in every direction : this layer extended as far as it was pierced in the examination, viz., about 1.2 cm, but was evidently of greater depth. D, D, two heaps of stones found in the lower stratum. E, the kitchen midden, in which was a large quantity of bones of deer, swine, oxen, &c., that lay 1.2 cm below the surface.

Canoe
An ancient canoe created from a single trunk of oak, 5.5m long, 55 cm broad, not formed for speed being square at stem and stern, and having apertures or rowlocks cut in the side, was found embedded in the mud on the shore opposite one of the islands, and about as deep below the level of the surface of the lake as the island itself. The canoe was in tolerable preservation when found, but fell to pieces after being some time exposed to the air. The recording of large numbers of ancient dug-out canoes found in county Leitrim remind us that waterways also provided a key means of transport both before and since the Middle Ages.

Museum artifacts
The following archaeological artefacts were discovered at Drumaleague Lough in the 19th century, and probably preserved at the Royal Irish Academy museum, or at the National Museum of Ireland-
 The thin topstone of a quern, formed of micaceous quartzite, smooth upon the grinding surface, but otherwise rude and unfinished was found on Drumaleague crannog number two: the hole for the handle passes quite through, and the grain-hole, 6.4 cm in diameter, is not directly in the centre.
 One cask of bones found on the Drumaleague crannog number two.
 A portion of a door-frame, with mortices and cheeks cut into it, from one of the crannogs.

See also
 List of loughs in Ireland
 Lough Conway
 Carrickaport Lough

References and notes

Notes

Citations

Primary references

Secondary references

External links 

Lakes of County Leitrim
Places of Conmaicne Maigh Nissi